Codex Mosquensis II designated by V or 031 (in the Gregory-Aland numbering), ε 75 (von Soden), is a Greek uncial manuscript of the Gospels, dated palaeographically to the 9th century. The manuscript is lacunose.

Description 

The codex contains the text of the four Gospels, on 220 parchment leaves, with some lacunae (Matthew 5:44-6:12, 9:18-10:1, 22:44-23:35, John 21:10-fin.). The leaves are arranged in octavo.

The text of the manuscript is written in one column per page, 28 lines per page, in small and fine uncial letters, in a kind of stichometry. It contains accents, but punctuation is rare.

The codex is written in uncial letters to John 8:39, where it breaks off, and from that point the text is continued in a minuscule hand from the 13th century.

The text is divided only according to the Ammonian Sections, with references to the Eusebian Canons; it has lectionary markings. According to Christian Frederick Matthaei it is written in a kind of stichometry by a diligent scribe.

The manuscript contains a portion from Chronology of Hippolitus from Theben.

John 8:39-21:10 

The text of the Gospel of John 8:39-21:10 is written in minuscule letters on 10 parchment leaves.

The text is divided according to the Ammonian Sections, whose numbers are given at the margin with references to the Eusebian Canons. It contains Synaxarion.

The minuscule text was designated by Griesbach as 87, by Scholz as 250.

Text 
The Greek text of this codex is a representative of the Byzantine text-type. Aland placed it in Category V. It is a member of the textual family Family E. It has some textual resemblance to Codex Campianus.

It lacks the text of Matthew 16:2b–3 (the Signs of the Times).

History and present Location 

Formerly the manuscript was held at the monastery Vatopedi at Athos peninsula. It was brought to Moscow in 1655, by the monk Arsenius, on the suggestion of the Patriarch Nikon, in the reign of Alexei Mikhailovich Romanov (1645–1676). The manuscript was collated by Matthaei.

It was collated by Matthaei in 1779 and in 1783. In 1783 the manuscript lacked only the texts Matthew 22:44-23:35, John 21:10-fin. It was one of the best manuscripts of Matthaei.
Constantin von Tischendorf used the work of Matthaei in his Novum Testamentum. Gregory saw the manuscript in 1868. The manuscript was examined by Kurt Treu.

In 1908 C. R. Gregory gave siglum 031 to it.

The codex is located now in the State Historical Museum (V. 9).

See also 

 List of New Testament uncials
 Textual criticism
 Biblical manuscript

References

Further reading 

 C. F. Matthaei, Novum Testamentum Graece et Latine, Riga, 1782–1788, IX, pp. 265 ff (as V)

Greek New Testament uncials
9th-century biblical manuscripts